Begenchmuhammed Kuliyev (born 4 April 1977 in Soviet Union) is a Turkmen football player. He was the top goal scorer of the Turkmenistan national football team in 2004.

Kulyýew previously played for FC Kristall Smolensk in the Russian Football National League during the 2001 season.

International career statistics

Goals for Senior National Team

References

External links

Profile at ballsandwhistles.com

Expatriate footballers in Iran
Expatriate footballers in Kazakhstan
Turkmenistan footballers
Turkmenistan expatriate footballers
1977 births
Living people
FK Köpetdag Aşgabat players
FC Aşgabat players
FC Kristall Smolensk players
F.C. Aboomoslem players
FC Vostok players
FC Shakhter Karagandy players
Turkmenistan expatriate sportspeople in Iran
Turkmenistan expatriate sportspeople in Kazakhstan
2004 AFC Asian Cup players
Turkmenistan international footballers
Association football midfielders
Footballers at the 1998 Asian Games
Asian Games competitors for Turkmenistan